Juan Facundo Moyano (born 25 December 1984) is an Argentine trade unionist and politician. A member of the Party of Culture, Education and Labour (CET), Moyano was a National Deputy for Buenos Aires Province from 2011 to 2021.

From 2009 to 2017, Moyano was Secretary General of the Sindicato Único de Trabajadores de los Peajes y Afines (SUTPA, the toll booth workers' union). Moyano is the son of Hugo Moyano, one of Argentina's most prominent union leaders and former Secretary General of the General Confederation of Labour.

Early life and education
Juan Facundo Moyano was born on 25 December 1984 in Mar del Plata, the fifth of Hugo Moyano's nine children, and the first by his second wife, Elvira Cortés. Hugo Moyano is widely considered to be one of the most prominent union leaders in Argentina, having presided over the Buenos Aires Province Teamsters' Union (Sindicato de Choferes de Camiones de Buenos Aires) since 1987.

He has lived in Buenos Aires since he was 20 years old. He has a degree on Image Assessment and Public Consulting from Universidad Camilo José Cela.

Career
Moyano has been active in union politics since 2005. In 2006, he co-founded the Sindicato Único de Trabajadores de los Peajes y Afines (SUTPA), a specialized union for toll booth workers in the Greater Buenos Aires, organized within the General Confederation of Labour (CGT). SUTPA gained major concessions from private contractors in 2007 and 2008. In March 2009, Moyano was elected Secretary General of the union, and was re-elected in 2013, after which the union introduced term limits for the position.

National Deputy

Moyano was first elected to the Chamber of Deputies in 2011, as the 11th candidate in the Front for Victory list in Buenos Aires Province. He was elected and sat in the Front for Victory bloc, aligned with the government of then-president Cristina Fernández de Kirchner. By 2012, however, the relationship between the CGT and Fernández de Kirchner's government had deteriorated, and in 2013, Moyano split from the FPV bloc. That year, Hugo Moyano founded the Party of Culture, Education and Labour (CET Party), which Facundo Moyano joined. In the Chamber of Deputies, Moyano formed part of the Renewal Front bloc, led by Sergio Massa.

Ahead of the 2015 legislative election, Moyano was the first deputy candidate in the United for a New Alternative (UNA) list in Buenos Aires Province. The UNA list received 20.98% of the popular vote in Buenos Aires Province, and Moyano was re-elected. In 2018, Moyano and a group of deputies broke ranks with the Renewal Front and formed the Red por Argentina parliamentary bloc. Before the 2019 general election, the CET Party, alongside the entirety of the CGT, joined forces with other Peronist political groups and formed the Frente de Todos (FDT) to back the presidential candidacy of Alberto Fernández. Moyano was the eleventh candidate in the FDT deputies list in Buenos Aires Province, which received 51.64% of the vote, allowing for Moyano to be re-elected.

As deputy, Moyano introduced legislation on labour affairs and on transport. In 2020, he introduced a bill to reduce the legal alcohol levels for drivers to 0. For the 2019–2023 term, Moyano was part of the parliamentary commissions on Science and Technology, Sports, Population and Human Development, Industry, Labour Legislation, and Transport. He was a vocal supporter of the legalization of abortion in Argentina, voting in favour of the two Voluntary Interruption of Pregnancy bills that were debated by the Argentine Congress in 2018 and 2020.

Moyano resigned from his seat in the Chamber of Deputies on 12 August 2021.

Personal life
Moyano's romantic life has been subject to media scrutiny. He has been intermittently linked to models Nicole Neumann and Eva Bargiela. On 15 October 2021, Moyano and Bargiela married in a private ceremony in Palermo, Buenos Aires.

In March 2021, during the COVID-19 pandemic in Argentina, Moyano stated that he would not get the vaccine, and called COVID-19 a "very psychosomatic, very strange disease". He would later apologize and retract his statements. Moyano had previously tested positive for COVID-19.

References

External links

Profile on the official website of the Chamber of Deputies (in Spanish)

1984 births
Living people
People from Mar del Plata
Argentine trade union leaders
Members of the Argentine Chamber of Deputies elected in Buenos Aires Province
Justicialist Party politicians
Renewal Front politicians
21st-century Argentine politicians